Walter Bagot may refer to:

Sir Walter Bagot (died 1622) (1557–1622/23), Member of Parliament for Tamworth
Sir Walter Bagot, 3rd Baronet (1644–1704), English barrister and landowner
Sir Walter Bagot, 5th Baronet (1702–1768), English Member of Parliament
Walter Bagot (priest) (1731–1806), English cleric and landowner
Walter Bagot (architect) (1880–1963), South Australian architect

See also
Baron Bagot